The 2011 animated musical adventure comedy film Rio, produced by Blue Sky Studios and 20th Century Fox Animation, and directed by Carlos Saldanha, featured two albums released for the film: an original soundtrack and an original score. Interscope Records released the film's soundtrack Rio (Music from the Motion Picture) on April 5, 2011 in digital formats, and a physical release on April 12. The album produced by the film's composer John Powell, and Brazilian musician Sérgio Mendes, featured collaborations from Brazilian and American artists, along with songs performed by the film's cast members. The music received critical acclaim from critics, praising the Brazilian influences in the music and creative choices of involving the native musicians to influence South American culture. Powell's score was separate album, titled Rio (Original Motion Picture Score) was released by Varèse Sarabande on April 19, 2011.

Soundtrack album 

The soundtrack takes inspiration from Brazilian music, and several songs under various genres were written and produced. Brazilian musician Sérgio Mendes contributed to the soundtrack, as an executive producer with John Powell. On March 13, 2011, during his performance at the Geffen Playhouse in Los Angeles, Mendes revealed the official soundtrack list, and also announced that he would re-record the classical Brazilian song "Mas que Nada" for the film and album. 

Stating his involvement in the project, Mendes said that "The film is such a celebration of Brazilian life, of Carnival, the nature, the rhythms, the joy, the sensuality. It’s nicely timed with my record." The album featured performances from the film's cast, Jesse Eisenberg, Anne Hathaway, Jamie Foxx, along with rapper-singer will.i.am (also featuring in the film's cast), and contributions from Brazilian artists Carlinhos Brown, Mikael Mutti, Gracinha Leporace, Bebel Gilberto, American artists Siedah Garrett, Ester Dean and British singer-songwriter Taio Cruz performing.

Release 
On March 18, 2011, Brazilian-English singer-songwriter Taio Cruz released a music video and theme song named "Telling the World" on YouTube for the soundtrack. The single was later released for digital download on March 20. The soundtrack was digitally released by Interscope Records on April 5, and was distributed in physical CD formats, the following week (April 12). will.i.am performed a remix of the track "Drop It Low", to celebrate the film's release and uploaded it on YouTube on April 11, 2011.

Track listing

Standard

International version

Brazilian version 
In the Brazilian edition some songs gained a Portuguese version performed by famous Brazilian artists such as Ivete Sangalo (replacing Ester Dean in "Take You to Rio (Remix)") and Carlinhos Brown (replacing Jamie Foxx in "Fly Love"). "Real in Rio" became "Favo de Mel" (Honeycomb) but it was performed by the same artists as the English version.

Reception 
Reviewing the soundtrack, Jason Newman of MTV wrote "The toe-tapping, easily digestible rhythms inherent in so much classic Brazilian music dovetails nicely with a movie geared toward children. But since kids don't spend money, we also get Taio Cruz and will.i.am to ensure that those precious commercial demographics are hit. It's a win for 20th Century Fox; a half-win for the rest of us." Matt Collar of AllMusic wrote "Rio is a sunny, dance-oriented album well suited to the film's South American setting."

Charts

Accolades 
At the 39th Annie Awards, the music received a nomination for Best Music in a Feature Production but lost to John Williams for The Adventures of Tintin. The song "Real in Rio" was nominated for Best Original Song at the 84th Academy Awards, but lost to the other nominee, "Man or Muppet" from The Muppets.

Personnel 
Credits adapted from CD liner notes.

 Producer – John Powell, Sergio Mendes
 Programming – Beth Caucci, Michael John Mollo, Paul Mounsey, Victor Chaga
 Arrangements – Beth Caucci, Michael John Mollo, Paul Mounsey, Victor Chaga, John Powell
 Recording – Bill Schnee, Marc Viner, Shawn Murphy, Aubry "Big Juice" Delaine, Padraic "Padlock" Kerin, will.i.am, Matt Shane,  Mikkel Storleer Eriksen, Miles Walker, Tim Lauber, Erik Swanson
 Music editor – Tom Carlson
 Score editor – David Channing
 Engineer – Denis St. Amand, Adam Kagan, Juliette Amoroso, Damien Lewis
 Mixing – Brad Haehnel, Shawn Murphy, Bill Schnee, Greg Hayes, John Traunwieser, Marc Viner, Matt Ward, Dyland "3D" Dresdow, Phil Tan, Didiê Cunha
 Mastering – Fernando Lee, Stephen Marsh
 Music co-ordinator – Germaine Franco
 Music preparation – Joann Kane Music Service, Mark Graham
 Musical Assistance – Devin Kelly, Eric Wegener, Erin McAnally, Grace Lai, Jacob Merryman
 Instruments
 Bass – Nico Abondolo, René Camacho
 Flute – Pedro Eustache
 Guitar – George Doering, Jemaine Clement, Kleber Jorge, Mikael Mutti
 Percussion – Alberto Lopez, Antonio DeSantanna, Carlos A.S. De Oliveira, Davi Vieira, Jose "Ce Bruno" Eisenberg, Jose Jesus, Leonardo Costa, Luis Claudio Candido, Marco "Gibi" Dos Santos, Mikael Mutti, Nailton "Meia Noite" Dos Santos, Wagner Profeta Santos, Carlinhos Brown
 Whistle – Carlinhos Brown, John Powell, Mikael Mutti
 Orchestra
 Orchestration – Andrew Kinney, Ben Wallfisch=, Dave Metzger, Germaine Franco, John Ashton Thomas, Jon Kull, Randy Kerber, Rick Giovinazzo
 MIDI orchestration – Beth Caucci, Michael John Mollo, Paul Mounsey, Victor Chaga
 Concertmaster – Bruce Dukov
 Score conductor – Pete Anthony
 Score contractor – Gina Zimmitti
 Vocal contractor – Edie Lehmann Boddicker
 Stage manager – Greg Dennen, Tom Steel
 Management
 Business affairs (Interscope Records) – Jason Kawejsza, Rand Hoffman
 Business affairs (Twentieth Century Fox) – Tom Cavanaugh
 Director of international marketing – Tomoko Itoki
 Executive in charge of music (Interscope Records) – Tony Seyler
 Executive in charge of music (Twentieth Century Fox) – Robert Kraft
 Head of international marketing – Jurgen Grebner
 Marketing (Interscope Records) – Julie Hovsepian
 Music clearance – Ellen Ginsburg
 Soundtrack executive producer (Twentieth Century Fox) – Andrew Van Meter
 Music production supervisor (Twentieth Century Fox) – Rebecca Morellato
 Music supervisor (Twentieth Century Fox) – Danielle Diego
 Music co-ordinator (Twentieth Century Fox) – Johnny Choi
 Artwork
 Art direction – Dina Hovsepian
 Graphics – David Dibble, Jason Sadler, Tom Cardone
 Illustration – Marcella Bingham

Original score 

As with previous Blue Sky's productions, John Powell composed the film's original score, which was released into a separate album on April 19, 2011, by Varèse Sarabande.

Track listing

Reception 
Filmtracks.com wrote "After Powell's stunning success with How to Train Your Dragon, his scores will inevitably be compared to that benchmark, and while Rio exhibits the same talent in its ranks, the 2011 score lacks the cohesiveness and consistently impressive passages of its predecessor. Those who don't care for the heavy, parody-like Latin influence will likely prefer the composer's recent Mars Needs Moms. Still, Powell is almost always good for a solid three stars in response to these kinds of efforts, and he achieves that rating again with ease." James Christopher Monger of AllMusic wrote "Powell, who worked on all of the Ice Age sequels, as well as King Fu Panda and How to Train Your Dragon, is no stranger to animated films, and his work here is both unobtrusive and effective, blending Midwest Americana and sunny tropicalismo into a tasty summer beverage."

Personnel 
Credits adapted from CD liner notes.

 Composer, producer – John Powell
 Assistant production – Devin Kelly, Eric Wegener, Erin McAnally, Grace Lai, Jacob Merryman
 Programming, arrangements – Dominic Lewis, Paul Mounsey, Beth Caucci, Michael Mollo, Victor Chaga
 Engineer – Denis St. Amand
 Recording – Erik Swanson
 Mixing – Brad Haehnel, Shawn Murphy, Greg Hayes, John Traunwieser, Marc Viner, Matt Ward
 Mastering – Fernando Lee, Stephen Marsh
 Editing – David Channing, Tom Carlson
 Executive producer – Robert Townson
 Music co-ordinator – Germaine Franco
 Copyist – Joann Kane Music Service, Mark Graham
 Instruments
 Bass – Ann Atkinson, Bruce Morgenthaler, Chris Kollgaard, Ed Meares, Frances Liu, Mike Valerio, Sue Ranney
 Bassoon – John Mitchell, John Steinmetz, Rose Corrigan
 Cello – Tony Cooke, Tina Soule, Chris Ermacoff, Erika Duke Kirkpatrick, Jodi Burnett, Miguel Martinez, Paul Cohen, Paula Hochhalter, Steve Richards, Tim Loo, Victor Lawrence
 Clarinet – Greg Huckins, Justo Almario, Stuart Clark
 Drums – Mike Shapiro
 Electric Bass – Nico Abondolo, Rene Camacho
 Flute – Chris Bleth, Geri Rotella, Heather Clark, Pedro Eustache
 French Horn – Dan Kelley, Dylan Hart, Jim Thatcher, Jennie Kim, Joe Meyer, Phil Yao, Steve Becknell, Teag Reeves
 Guitar – George Doering, Jemaine Clement, Kleber Jorge, Marcel Camargo, Mikael Mutti, Roberto Montero
 Harp – Katie Kirkpatrick, Marcia Dickstein
 Keyboards – Sergio Mendes
 Oboe – David Weiss, John Yoakum
 Percussion – Alberto Lopez, Antonio DeSantanna, Carlos A.S. De Oliveira, Davi Vieira, Jose "Ce Bruno" Eisenberg, Jose Jesus, Leonardo Costa, Luis Claudio Candido, Marco "Gibi" Dos Santos, Mikael Mutti, Nailton "Meia Noite" Dos Santos, Wagner Profeta Santos, Carlinhos Brown
 Piano, celesta – Randy Kerber
 Saxophone – Dan Higgins, John Mitchell
 Trombone – Alex Iles, Andrew Lippman, Bill Reichenbach, Charlie Loper, Phil Teele
 Trumpet – Dan Fornero, Harry Kim, Jon Lewis, Rick Baptist
 Tuba – Doug Tornquist
 Viola – Alma Fernandez, Andrew Duckles, Brian Dembow, Darren Mc Cann, David Walther, Kate Reddish, Kazi Pitelka, Keith Green, Lynne Richberg, Marlow Fisher, Matt Funes, Thomas Diener, Vickie Miskolczy
 Violin – Alan Grunfeld, Alyssa Park, Ana Landauer, Bruce Dukov, Carol Pool, Darius Campo, Eric Hosler, Eun Mee Ahn, Eve Butler, Grace Oh, Irina Voloshina, Jennie Levin*, Joel Derouin, Julie Rogers, Katia Popov, Kevin Connolly, Liane Mautner, Lily Ho Chen, Marc Sazer, Marina Manukian, Natalie Leggett, Neel Hammond, Nina Evtuhov, Richard Altenbach, Roberto Cani, Sara Parkins, Shalini Vijayan, Sid Page, Tami Hatwan, Yelena Yegoryan, Roger Wilkie
 Whistle – Carlinhos Brown, John Powell, Mikael Mutti
 Orchestra
 Performer – The Hollywood Studio Symphony
 Orchestrated By – Andrew Kinney, Ben Wallfisch, Dave Metzger, Germaine Franco, John Ashton Thomas, Jon Kull, Randy Kerber, Rick Giovinazzo
 Concertmaster – Bruce Dukov
 Score conductor – Pete Anthony
 Score contractor – Gina Zimmitti
 Recording – Tim Lauber
 Stage manager – Greg Dennen, Tom Steel
 Management
 Business affairs (Twentieth Century Fox) – Tom Cavanaugh
 Music clearance (Twentieth Century Fox) – Ellen Ginsburg
 Executive in charge of music (Twentieth Century Fox) – Robert Kraft
 Music co-ordinator (Twentieth Century Fox) – Johnny Choi
 Music supervision (Twentieth Century Fox) – Danielle Diego
 Music production supervisor (Twentieth Century Fox) – Rebecca Morellato

References 

2011 soundtrack albums
Rio (franchise)
John Powell (film composer) soundtracks
Interscope Records soundtracks
Varèse Sarabande soundtracks
Pop soundtracks
Rhythm and blues soundtracks
Pop rock soundtracks
Latin pop soundtracks
Alternative hip hop albums
Film scores